Dinner is the most significant and important meal of the day, which can be the noon or the evening meal.

Dinner may also refer to:
Dinner (film), a 2016 Nigerian comedy film
Dinner (play), by Moira Buffini
Dinner Creek, a creek in Minnesota
Dinner Lake, a lake of Highlands County, Florida, United States

People with the surname
Michael Dinner (born 1953), American television director, producer and writer

See also
The Dinner (disambiguation)
Dinner Time (disambiguation)
Kraft Dinner, packaged macaroni and cheese
Supper
Diner